Major Sir Keith Alexander Fraser, 5th Baronet (1867–1935) was a British cavalry officer, and a Conservative Member of Parliament for Harborough from 1918 until 1923.

Biography
Keith Fraser was born in 1867. He was the son of General James Keith Fraser (the third son of Sir James John Fraser, 3rd Baronet (d. 1834)), and his wife Amelia Alice Julia (daughter of the Humble Dudley Ward). He was educated at Eaton.

Fraser joined the 7th Queen's Own Hussars and as a captain saw active service with his regiment in Southern Africa. He fought in the First Matabele War (in what is now Zimbabwe) and was awarded the British South Africa Company Medal in 1893. He also saw action in the Second Matabele War and was awarded the clasp in 1897.

Fraser succeeded his cousin Sir William Augustus Fraser, 4th Baronet to the title of baronet in 1898. He contested the Parliamentary seat of Caithness-shire in 1906, and the Bosworth division of Leicestershire in January 1910. He was Conservative Member of Parliament for Harborough from 1918 until 1923.

Fraser was a friend of Baden Powell and presented the Fraser Shield to the Boy Scouts in 1912 and the Fraser Shield Camping Competition is now thought by the organisers to be the longest running camping competition in Scouting.

Family
Fraser married Dorothy (daughter of George, 9th Earl of Coventry) on  30 August 1910. In 1911 they had a son Keith Charles Adolphus Fraser who was born in London.

See also
Fraser baronets

Notes

References
 "Sir Keith Alexander Fraser, s. of Lieut. - Gen. James Keith Fraser, CMO, 3rd son of the 2nd bait., by Amelia Alice Julia, d. of the Hon. Humble Dudley Ward. It. 1867 ; succeeded his cousin 1898;"

Further reading

1867 births
1935 deaths
7th Queen's Own Hussars officers
Place of birth missing
Conservative Party (UK) MPs for English constituencies
UK MPs 1918–1922
Baronets in the Baronetage of the United Kingdom